Tenenet, alts. Tjenenet, Zenenet, Tanenet, Tenenit, Manuel de Codage transliteration Tnn.t, was an ancient Egyptian goddess of childbirth, protection, and beer. She is mentioned in texts dating from the Ptolemaic period as well as in the Book of the Dead.

Associations with childbirth and beer
Tenenet was associated with childbirth and was invoked as the protector of the uterus for pregnant women. She was also the patron goddess of brewers.

Worship
Her cult centre was at Hermonthis. She was a consort of Monthu. She was later merged with Raet-Tawy, Isis and Iunit.

References

Egyptian goddesses
Childhood goddesses
Alcohol goddesses
Deities of wine and beer

ca:Llista de personatges de la mitologia egípcia#T